Michael O'Hare (born June 1981) is a British chef from Middlesbrough, North Yorkshire, England. He is chef-patron at The Man Behind The Curtain in Leeds, which was awarded a Michelin star in October 2015. He is also Creative Director of GG Hospitality and oversees the company's restaurant The Rabbit in the Moon at the National Football Museum in Manchester.

O'Hare began cooking whilst at university before becoming a professional chef, gaining experience at various restaurants including John Burton-Race at The Landmark and Noma.

Early life and career 
O'Hare was born in  Middlesbrough England. He describes Redcar, North Yorkshire as his home town. From the age of 11 to 18 he studied classical and modern ballet. He briefly studied aerospace engineering at Kingston University, London, deciding to leave the course after a few months. In his early twenties, he worked in a call centre in Thornaby, Stockton-on-Tees for energy company nPower.

It was during his time at university at the age of 19 that O'Hare began cooking: "I just liked going to the supermarket. I wasn't making sauces and all that. Just buying a bit of fish and grilling it."

Instead of attending catering college, he decided to begin his cooking career learning within professional kitchens, with his first job at Judges in Yarm. Other restaurants where he worked include Seaham Hall, working for John Burton-Race at The Landmark and Noma before becoming head chef at The Blind Swine in York.

In 2014, O'Hare opened his restaurant with the backing of Stephen Baylis, The Man Behind The Curtain in Leeds, where he is chef-patron.

He has gained a reputation for creative and often unusual dishes. These include chocolate pudding with potato foam, raw prawn tails with cooked prawn brains and a dessert with baked potato custard. In 2015, O'Hare took part in BBC2's The Great British Menu where he made a dish entitled 'Emancipation' – a fish dish inspired by fish and chips served on a canvas.

GG Hospitality 
In 2016, O'Hare became Creative Director of GG Hospitality, a company created by ex-professional footballers Ryan Giggs and Gary Neville. The company, along with O'Hare, opened a 'space-age Asian' restaurant called The Rabbit in the Moon at the National Football Museum in Manchester on 3 January 2017. O'Hare is also due to set up a fine dining restaurant – The Man Who Fell To Earth, and a less formal restaurant called Are Friends Electric within a new Manchester hotel at the Manchester Stock Exchange owned by GG Hospitality.

Media 
O'Hare competed in BBC2's The Great British Menu in 2015. In 2016, he appeared on BBC's Masterchef. He also made guest appearances on BBC's Saturday Kitchen and on Yes Chef in 2016 on BBC One. In 2016, 2017, 2018, 2019, 2020 and 2023 he returned to The Great British Menu as a judge.

Personal life 
O'Hare has one child. O'Hare has become well known for his individual personal style. He became instantly recognisable with his 'rockstar hair' after his appearance on The Great British Menu and says “I know for a fact there could have been TV shows off the back of that haircut.” He is a qualified pilot, gaining his licence in Daytona a few years after leaving university.

Television 
The Great British Menu – 2015, 2016, 2017, 2018, 2019, 2020, 2022 and 2023
Saturday Kitchen – 2015
Masterchef – 2016
Yes Chef – 2016

References

External links 
Restaurant website Themanbehindthecurtain.co.uk
Bio at BBC.co.uk
Interview at Staff Canteen
The Rabbit in the Moon Official website therabbitinthemoon.com

1981 births
Living people
English chefs
English television chefs
Head chefs of Michelin starred restaurants
British television chefs